
Gmina Rudniki is a rural gmina (administrative district) in Olesno County, Opole Voivodeship, in south-western Poland.

Neighbouring gminas
Gmina Rudniki is bordered by the gminas of Krzepice, Lipie, Pątnów, Praszka and Radłów.

Villages
The gmina contains the villages of Banasiówka, Bliźniaki, Bobrowa, Borek, Brzeziny Cieciułowskie, Bugaj, Chwiły, Cieciułów, Dalachów, Faustianka, Hajdamaki, Ignachy, Janinów, Jaworek, Jaworzno, Jaworzno Bankowe, Jelonki, Julianpol, Kuźnica, Kuźnica Żytniowska, Łazy, Mirowszczyzna, Młyny, Mostki, Nowy Bugaj, Odcinek, Pieńki, Polesie, Porąbki, Rudniki, Słowików, Stanki, Stary Bugaj, Stawki Cieciułowskie, Stawki Żytniowskie, Teodorówka, Wytoka, Żurawie and Żytniów.

Of these, the following have the status of sołectwo: Bobrowa, Bugaj, Chwiły, Cieciułów, Dalachów, Faustianka, Janinów, Jaworek, Jaworzno, Jelonki, Julianpol, Kuźnica, Łazy, Mirowszczyzna, Młyny, Mostki, Odcinek, Porąbki, Rudniki, Słowików, Żytniów.

Twin towns – sister cities

Gmina Rudniki is twinned with:
 Feilitzsch, Germany
 Soblahov, Slovakia

References

Rudniki
Olesno County